Stéphanie Plante (born July 1979) is a Canadian politician. She is currently the city councillor for Rideau-Vanier Ward on Ottawa City Council. She was first elected in the 2022 Ottawa municipal election.

Early life
Plante was born in Tecumseh, Ontario,  the daughter of a Swiss mother and a Quebecois father. 

Plante attended the University of Windsor, where she received a bachelors and masters degree in political science. While attending the university, she did an internship with Liberal Member of Parliament Herb Gray, resulting in a move to Ottawa in 2004, first settling in Vanier. After moving to Ottawa, she worked for Elections Canada, and taught municipal governance at the University of Ottawa. In 2020, as a member of the Sandy Hill Community Association, Plante began a successful campaign to re-name a neighbourhood park after local artist Annie Pootoogook who had drowned in 2016.  

In 2017, she was a gestational surrogate for a gay couple, who now live in Spain.

Career
Rideau-Vanier Ward's councillor Mathieu Fleury announced he was not running for re-election in the 2022 Ottawa municipal election, leaving the seat open. Plante decided to run for the seat, citing working for "every level of government, [being] a volunteer in the community, and [knowing] the issues and how the system works".  
In the campaign, Plante won the endorsement of former Liberal MPP Madeleine Meilleur and former mayor Jacquelin Holzman.  Her main priorities in the election were improving health-care options and attracting new doctors to the ward, by having the city consult with physicians to see how to make the community attractive, opposing more homeless shelters, promotion and protection of the ByWard Market, more affordable housing and making the ward's neighbourhoods safer.  In the election, Plante won the ward by just 323 votes, or 37% of the vote, defeating fellow University of Ottawa professor Laura Shantz.     

Following her election, Plante was named Vice-Chair of the Built Heritage Committee and was named to the Community Services Committee, the Emergency Preparedness and Protective Services Committee, to the Ottawa Community Housing Corporation, and the Shaw Centre Board of Directors.

References

Living people
1979 births
Ottawa city councillors
Women municipal councillors in Canada
21st-century Canadian women politicians
University of Windsor alumni 
People from Essex County, Ontario
Franco-Ontarian people
Academic staff of the University of Ottawa 
Canadian people of Swiss-French descent